Dominik Starkl (born 6 November 1993) is an Austrian professional footballer who plays as a right winger for SKU Amstetten.

Career
Bustling young forward Dominik Starkl began his career at Kremser SC in Lower Austria. In 2006 Starkl spent a season at SC Getzersdorf's youth academy, before transferring to SKN St. Pölten where he spent four years. Starkl's performances and growing reputation attracted the attentions of Austria's most successful club, SK Rapid Vienna, who moved in to secure his signature in 2011.

Rapid Vienna
Starkl's impressive start to life in Hütteldorf saw him quickly promoted from the youth ranks into the reserve team squad. Then reserve coach Zoran Barisic handed Starkl his debut in the famous green and white of Rapid on August 9, 2011 against SC Neusiedl am See. Starkl started the game before being withdrawn after 77 minutes in a game which Rapid won 2–1. During the 2011–12 season he would go on to make a further 25 appearances with an impressive return of 8 goals.

In 2012–13 Starkl made the jump from the reserves to first team squad. Then Trainer Peter Schöttel gave him his first taste of Bundesliga action when he introduced him as a second-half substitute in a game against SK Sturm Graz in November 2012. Starkl made an immediate impact, setting up Guido Burgstaller for Rapid's goal in a 2–1 loss.

The 2013–14 season saw Starkl continue his rise. He scored his first Bundesliga goal for the Green & Whites in the home match against FC Wacker Innsbruck as Rapid ran out clear 3–0 winners. He followed it up a few weeks later when he scored an important goal to get Rapid back into a game away to SV Grödig. Starkl scored a superb solo effort with Rapid trailing the home side 2–0 in a game that finished 2–2. 2013–14 also saw Starkl make his European debut when he came on as an 81st-minute substitute during Rapid's UEFA Europa League tie in Belgium against KRC Genk. The game ended 1–1.

Admira
On 15 June 2015, Starkl left Rapid Wien to join fellow Bundesliga club Admira Wacker on a season-long loan deal with Admira having the option to make the move permanent. The option was triggered in April 2016, and he signed a permanent deal. In seven seasons with the Admira, the striker made 142 Bundesliga appearances and 23 other competitive appearances, in which he scored a total of 20 times. With Admira, he suffered relegation from the Bundesliga at the end of the 2021–22 season.

SKU Amstetten
Starkl signed with Austrian Second Division club SKU Amstetten ahead of the 2022–23 season, penning a contract until June 2024.

References

1993 births
Living people
Association football forwards
Austrian footballers
Austrian Football Bundesliga players
SK Rapid Wien players
FC Admira Wacker Mödling players
SKU Amstetten players
Austria youth international footballers
Austria under-21 international footballers
People from Krems an der Donau
Footballers from Lower Austria